Eli Lamar Whiteley (December 10, 1913 – December 2, 1986) was a former infantry captain in the United States Army who received the Medal of Honor for valor in World War II, for his actions in Sigolsheim, France in 1944. He was drafted into the US Army in April 1942.

Medal of Honor
Whiteley's Medal of Honor citation reads:
 While leading his platoon on December 27, 1944, in savage house-to-house fighting through the fortress town of Sigolsheim, France, he attacked a building through a street swept by withering mortar and automatic weapons fire. He was hit and severely wounded in the arm and shoulder; but he charged into the house alone and killed its 2 defenders. Hurling smoke and fragmentation grenades before him, he reached the next house and stormed inside, killing 2 and capturing 11 of the enemy. He continued leading his platoon in the extremely dangerous task of clearing hostile troops from strong points along the street until he reached a building held by fanatical Nazi troops. Although suffering from wounds which had rendered his left arm useless, he advanced on this strongly defended house, and after blasting out a wall with bazooka fire, charged through a hail of bullets. Wedging his submachine gun under his uninjured arm, he rushed into the house through the hole torn by his rockets, killed 5 of the enemy and forced the remaining 12 to surrender. As he emerged to continue his fearless attack, he was again hit and critically wounded. In agony and with 1 eye pierced by a shell fragment, he shouted for his men to follow him to the next house. He was determined to stay in the fighting and remained at the head of his platoon until forcibly evacuated. By his disregard for personal safety, his aggressiveness while suffering from severe wounds, his determined leadership and superb courage, 1st Lt. Whiteley killed 9 Germans, captured 23 more and spearheaded an attack which cracked the core of enemy resistance in a vital area.

See also

List of Medal of Honor recipients for World War II

References

1913 births
1986 deaths
United States Army personnel of World War II
United States Army Medal of Honor recipients
North Carolina State University alumni
People from College Station, Texas
People from Georgetown, Texas
Texas A&M University alumni
United States Army officers
World War II recipients of the Medal of Honor
Military personnel from Texas